The Music Victoria Awards of 2013 are the eighth Annual Music Victoria Awards and consist of a series of awards, culminating on 20 November 2013. Previously known as The Age EG Awards, 2013 was the first year under the title Music Victoria Awards.

Hall of Fame inductees
 Renée Geyer and Michael Gudinski

Renée Geyer was the first solo female artist to be inducted into the Music Victoria Hall of Fame. Geyer said "As a Melbourne girl, getting inducted into the Hall of Fame by Music Victoria and the best newspaper in Australia means a lot to me." 

Michael Gudinski was inducted by Molly Meldrum as a recognition of Mushroom Records’s 40th anniversary and to acknowledge his enormous contribution to the Victorian music industry.

Award nominees and winners

All genre Awards
Winners indicated in boldface, with other nominees in plain.

Genre Specific Awards

References

External links
 

2013 in Australian music
2013 music awards
Music Victoria Awards